Pau dos Ferros is a municipality in the homonymous microregion, in Rio Grande do Norte state, Northeast Brazil.

History 
The city was founded on September 4, 1856, initially as a village and then the town today is a city that has as its main form of economy the industrial sector and to a lesser extent agriculture.

See also
List of municipalities in Rio Grande do Norte

References

Municipalities in Rio Grande do Norte